Clockwork Angels Tour is a live album and film of Canadian progressive rock band Rush's Clockwork Angels Tour, released on November 19, 2013. The performances were selected from the band's shows in Phoenix, Dallas, and San Antonio (November 25, 28 and 30, 2012, respectively). On May 14, 2014, the DVD release was certified Platinum by the RIAA.

Track listing

The CD album consists of three discs. Disc #1 contains the entire first set, disc #2 presents all tracks from the album Clockwork Angels that were performed during the tour, and disc #3 contains the rest of the second set plus encore and bonus tracks.

DVD/Blu-ray extras
 "Can't Stop Thinking Big" tour documentary film
 Behind the Scenes (featuring Jay Baruchel)
 Intro/post-show video outtakes
 Interview with Dwush
 Family Goy
 Family Sawyer
 The Watchmaker (Video intro for the second set)
 Office of the Watchmaker (Post-show video)

Personnel
Rush
Geddy Lee – vocals, bass guitar, keyboards
Alex Lifeson – guitar, backing vocals, piano on "The Garden"
Neil Peart – drums, percussion

Clockwork Angels String Ensemble
David Campbell – conductor
Mario De Leon – violin
Joel Derouin – violin
Jonathan Dinklage – violin
Gerry Hilera – violin
Audrey Solomon – violin
Adele Stein – cello
Jacob Szekely – cello
Hiroko Taguchi – violin
Entcho Todorov – violin

The ensemble is featured on all tracks in the second set except "The Percussor" and "The Spirit of Radio."

Charts
Audio

Certifications
DVD

References

2013 live albums
2013 video albums
Live video albums
Rush (band) live albums
Rush (band) video albums